Repo Man may refer to:

 Repo man, a repossession agent, a job that entails the retrieval of collateral or outstanding rented or leased objects

Art, entertainment, and media

Films
 Repo Man (film), a 1984 film by Alex Cox
 Repo! The Genetic Opera, a 2008 musical film by Darren Lynn Bousman
 Repo Men, a 2010 film by Miguel Sapochnik

Television
 "Repo Man" (X-Men episode), an episode from the X-Men animated series
 "Repo Man", an episode from the TV series Supernatural

Music
 "Repo Man" (soundtrack), soundtrack to the eponymous 1984 film Repo Man
 "Repo Man", a song by Iggy Pop from this soundtrack album 
 "Repo Man", a song from the 2010 album God Willin' & the Creek Don't Rise

Other uses
 Repo Man (wrestler), a ring name used by American professional wrestler Barry Darsow (born 1959)
Repo Chick

See also
Repo (disambiguation)